Kill is the tenth studio album by American death metal band Cannibal Corpse, released on March 21, 2006 through Metal Blade Records. This release marks the return of guitarist Rob Barrett, who had previously played on The Bleeding and Vile. The European version of the album comes with a live DVD filmed in Strasbourg in 2004 called Hammer Smashed Laiterie. The album was produced at Mana Recording Studios by Hate Eternal and future Cannibal Corpse guitarist Erik Rutan. It is also the first album in which the band tuned down to G# standard.

Music videos were produced for the tracks "Make Them Suffer" and "Death Walking Terror".

In the week following its release, Kill became the second Cannibal Corpse album to make an appearance on the Billboard 200 chart, debuting at number 170.

Artwork
The album cover is one of only three Cannibal Corpse album covers to not feature explicit graphic violence. Alex Webster, in an interview, stated that they decided to have an album cover such as this because all the band members couldn't agree on a cover for the album. Also he stated that they wanted their fans to focus on their music and not to be distracted by a violent cover. He stated "this time they wanted to do something different."

"The original art that Vince [Locke] gave us was really cool, but we didn't think it would make the best cover. We decided to use it as interior art, and just have a simple band logo/album title type cover. The main focus of our band should be music anyway, so I don't think it's a big deal that the cover's not a blood soaked scene of carnage the way our others have been. This doesn't mean we won't have more bloody covers in the future though."

Critical reception 

The album has been received quite positively by critics: AllMusic gave it a 3.5 out of 5 rating, stating that "Kill doesn't break any new ground for the veteran sickos, but if it ain't broke don't fix it -- just turn it up louder", while also commenting that the songs are "13 aural assaults that will be welcomed by fans with open mouths"; About.com gave it a 4.5 out of 5 rating, with the pros being "brutal, devastating death metal" and no cons.

In 2018, Kill was inducted into Decibel Magazine's Hall of Fame via a special Cannibal Corpse issue.

Track listing

Personnel 
Writing, performance and production credits are adapted from the album liner notes.

Cannibal Corpse 
 George "Corpsegrinder" Fisher – vocals
 Pat O'Brien – lead guitar
 Rob Barrett – rhythm guitar
 Alex Webster – bass
 Paul Mazurkiewicz – drums

Additional musicians 
 Erik Rutan – backing vocals on "The Time to Kill is Now"

Production 
 Erik Rutan – production, engineering, mixing
 Shawn Ohtani – additional engineering
 Alan Douches – mastering

Artwork and design 
 Vincent Locke – cover art
 Brian Ames – design
 Alex Solca – photography

Studios 
 Mana Recording Studios, St. Petersburg, FL, USA – recording, mixing
 West Westside Music – mastering

Charts

References

External links 
 
 Kill at Metal Blade Records

2006 albums
Albums produced by Erik Rutan
Cannibal Corpse albums
Metal Blade Records albums